Dunning Street Cemetery is a historic rural cemetery located at Malta, Saratoga County, New York. The cemetery was established about 1775, and incorporated by the Dunning Street Cemetery Association in 1908.  It is the final resting place of many important early Malta residents, including veterans of American Revolutionary War and includes a number of notable examples of 19th century local funerary art.  It remains an active burial ground.

It was listed on the National Register of Historic Places in 2015.

References

External links
 

Cemeteries on the National Register of Historic Places in New York (state)
1775 establishments in the Province of New York
Buildings and structures in Saratoga County, New York
National Register of Historic Places in Saratoga County, New York